Hygrophoropsis tapinia is a species of fungus in the family Hygrophoropsidaceae. It was described as new to science by mycologist Rolf Singer in 1946. Originally described from Florida, it was later recorded in Costa Rica.

References

External links

Hygrophoropsidaceae
Fungi described in 1946
Fungi of Central America
Fungi of North America
Taxa named by Rolf Singer